The Denmark national American football team is the official American football senior national team of Denmark. The national American football team is governed by the Danish American Football Federation

IFAF World Championship record

References

External links 
Denmark National American football team

American football teams in Denmark
Denmark
Organizations with year of establishment missing
National sports teams of Denmark